Anthony Lamb may refer to:

 Anthony Lamb (basketball) (born 1998), American professional basketball player
 Anthony Lamb (botanist) (born 1941), British botanist
 Tony Lamb (born 1939), Australian politician

See also
 Antony Lambton
 Anthony Lambert